Old Town Hall Historic District is a national historic district located at Huntington in Suffolk County, New York.  The district has eight contributing buildings.  It includes civic buildings, a church, a cemetery, and residential buildings. Properties date from initial settlement in 1653 to the early 20th century.  Located in the district are sites such as the Old Huntington Town Hall itself on the northeast corner of Main Street and Stewart Avenue, the Fort Golgotha and the Old Burial Hill Cemetery across from there, and the former Huntington Sewing and Trade School.

It was added to the National Register of Historic Places in 1985.

References

External links

Photograph of the Old Huntington Town Hall, by Dominick Kosciuk (Panoramio.com)
Old Huntington Town Hall image (Bygone Long Island)
Old Town Hall Historic District (Living Places)

National Register of Historic Places in Huntington (town), New York
Historic districts in Suffolk County, New York
Historic districts on the National Register of Historic Places in New York (state)